Deep Creek State Forest (DCSF) is a 380-acre state forest 11 miles north of St. Augustine, Florida in St. Johns County, Florida. Deep Creek State Forest is located on both sides of Deep Creek, for which it is named. The state forest is west of the Guana River Wildlife Management Area across the Intracoastal Waterway (Tolomato River).

See also
Deep Creek Conservation Area
List of Florida state forests

References

External links
 U.S. Geological Survey Map at the U.S. Geological Survey Map Website. Retrieved December 25th, 2022.

Florida state forests
Protected areas of St. Johns County, Florida